Ménil-Jean is a former commune in the Orne department in north-western France. On 1 January 2016, it was merged into the new commune of Putanges-le-Lac.

See also
 Communes of the Orne department

References 

Meniljean